Harold Robinson is an American former Negro league shortstop who played in the 1940s.

Robinson played for the Philadelphia Stars in 1940. In four recorded games, he posted one hit in seven plate appearances.

References

External links
 and Seamheads

Year of birth missing
Place of birth missing
Philadelphia Stars players
Baseball shortstops